Knoll Lake is part of the Blue Ridge Ranger District of the Coconino National Forest. It gets its name from a rocky island located in the middle of the lake. Knoll Lake is located in Leonard Canyon, Arizona, along the Mogollon Rim. This  lake is located at  elevation and is closed to visitors in the winter months. Bald eagles may be seen during the winter months if the roads are open late into the season. The facilities are maintained by Coconino National Forest division of the USDA Forest Service.

Fish species
 Rainbow Trout
 Brown Trout
 Brook Trout

References

External links
 USDA Forest Service Knoll Lake Official Website
 Knoll Lake Photos
 Arizona Fishing Locations Map
 Arizona Boating Locations Facilities Map
 Video of Knoll Lake

Lakes of Arizona
Lakes of Coconino County, Arizona
Coconino National Forest